Bill Salisbury may refer to:

 Solly Salisbury (1876–1952), Major League Baseball pitcher
 Bill Salisbury (footballer) (born 1899), Scottish footballer